The Tees Valley Railway was an  branch railway line that ran between Barnard Castle on the South Durham & Lancashire Union Railway line between Bishop Auckland and Kirkby Stephen East, and Middleton-in-Teesdale via three intermediate stations Cotherstone, Romaldkirk and Mickleton.

History
The first sod was cut on 19 June 1865 by the Duke of Cleveland, who owned a large portion of land that the railway would cross. Whilst building the line in August 1867, the foreman of works, in a hurry to build a viaduct at Baldersdale, removed the wooden frame from underneath the viaduct being built at Mickleton before the keystone was in place. Four men were injured due to falling bricks, but there were no fatalities. Both viaducts survive, but only the grade II listed Mickleton Viaduct is used as part of the Tees Valley Walk; Baldersdale viaduct is in private hands.

Opening
Built as the southern section of a proposed a line from Barnard Castle to  that was never completed the section to Middleton-in-Teesdale was built by the Tees Valley Railway opening on 13 May 1868, with intermediate stations at Mickleton and Cotherstone. Romaldkirk opened later in the July of the same year.

Traffic
The line was primarily used to transport stone from first the Middleton Quarry and later the Park End and Crossthwaite Quarries. Although Middleton Quarry closed in the 1930s the other two quarries outlasted the line. Stone was also forwarded from Greengates quarry and much of the stone from Lunedale quarry was railed out on a  tramway to exchange sidings between Mickleton and Middleton. Work started on a reservoir at Grassholme in 1914 and this provided extra traffic with the addition of transfer sidings for the construction site. The original intention of the line was to rail out lead from the adjacent hills, but by the time that the line had opened, the lead industry boom had mostly gone into reverse. However, in 1911, the station at Middleton railed out  of barytes.

A shed was provided at Middleton to service the steam trains up and down the line. Most trains worked beyond Barnard Castle and into  with at least five out and back workings daily in 1922 which had risen to six each way by the 1946 timetable.

Closure
The line closed for passenger traffic on 30 November 1964 and the line closed to freight on 5 April 1965.

The site today
Much of the line now forms the Tees Valley Railway Walk, with parking provided at the former site of Mickleton station.

References

Sources

External links

Mickleton station and line history
Details of the Tees Valley Railway Walk

North Eastern Railway (UK)
Closed railway lines in North East England
Rail transport in County Durham
Railway lines opened in 1868